Exploding head may refer to:

 a meme that originated in the 1981 film Scanners
 Exploding Head, an album by the rock band A Place to Bury Strangers
 Exploding head syndrome